Philipp Steiner (born 20 December 1986) is an Austrian footballer who plays as a defender for SC Neusiedl am See 1919.

References

Austrian footballers
Austrian Football Bundesliga players
2. Liga (Austria) players
Austrian Regionalliga players
SV Mattersburg players
1986 births
Living people
Association football defenders
SC Neusiedl 1919 players